Branchiostegus paxtoni, or Paxton's tilefish, is a species of marine ray-finned fish, a tilefish belonging to the family Malacanthidae. It is found in the Eastern Indian Ocean and is known only from a locality 190 km northwest of Port Hedland, Western Australia.

Etymology
The fish is named in honor of ichthyologist John R. Paxton (b. 1938), with the Australian Museum in Sydney.

References

Malacanthidae
Taxa named by James Keith Dooley
Taxa named by Patricia J. Kailola
Fish described in 1988